Al-Jalah Hospital is a hospital in Benghazi, Libya. The hospital treated the wounded of the Libyan Civil War.

References

Buildings and structures in Benghazi
Hospitals in Libya